For information on all Presbyterian College sports, see Presbyterian Blue Hose

The Presbyterian Blue Hose football program is the intercollegiate American football team for Presbyterian College located in the U.S. state of South Carolina. The team competes in the NCAA Division I Football Championship Subdivision (FCS); while Presbyterian is a full member of the Big South Conference, it plays football in the Pioneer Football League. Presbyterian's first football team was fielded in 1913. The team plays its home games at the 6,500 seat Bailey Memorial Stadium in Clinton, South Carolina. The Blue Hose were coached by Kevin Kelley, who was hired to lead the program on May 6, 2021,  but who left at the end of the season. The current coach is Steve Englehart. The Blue Hose began a transition to non-scholarship football in 2017 and left Big South football after the 2019 season, while otherwise remaining a full Big South member. The Blue Hose football program played the 2020–21 season as an independent and joined the Pioneer League in July 2021 upon completion of its transition.

History

Classifications
1938–1950: NCAA College Division
1951–1956: Unknown
1957–1969: NAIA
1970–1992: NAIA Division I
1993–2010: NCAA Division II
2011–present: NCAA Division I FCS

Conference memberships
1913–1920: Independent
1921–1941: Southern Intercollegiate Athletic Association
1942–1945: Independent
1946–1964: South Carolina Little Three
1964–1972: Carolinas Conference
1973–1974: NAIA independent
1975–2006: South Atlantic Conference
2007: NCAA Division II Independent
2008–2019: Big South Conference
2020: Division I FCS Independent
 Presbyterian played the 2020–21 season in a scheduling agreement with the Pioneer Football League. It was not eligible for the conference title, but was eligible for individual awards and honors.
2021–present: Pioneer Football League

See also List of Presbyterian Blue Hose football seasons

Presbyterian vs. In-State NCAA Division I schools

Notable former players
Justin Bethel, cornerback and special teams player for the New England Patriots
Rock Ya-Sin, cornerback for the Las Vegas Raiders
Bob Waters, quarterback for the San Francisco 49ers

Playoff appearances

NCAA Division II
The Blue Hose made one appearances in the Division II playoffs, with a combined record of 0-1.

NAIA 
The Blue Hose appeared in the NAIA playoffs two times. Their combined record was 2–2.

Bowl games
Presbyterian has participated in one bowl game, with the Blue Hose having a record of 0–1

References

External links
 

 
American football teams established in 1913
1913 establishments in South Carolina